Sudaghlan (also Romanized as Sūdaghlān and Sowdāghlān) is a village in Yateri Rural District, in the Central District of Aradan County, Semnan Province, Iran. At the 2006 census, its population was 42, in 13 families.

References 

Populated places in Aradan County